Winnipeg Centre was a provincial electoral division in Manitoba, Canada.  It existed in three separate periods, each time using different electoral systems: 1888-1920 single-member and two-member district using First Past The Post; 1949 to 1953 four-member district using STV; 1959 to 1981 single-member district using First Past The Post.

It was initially created for the 1888 provincial election, and was abolished before the 1920 election when Winnipeg was made into a single ten-member constituency. It was then re-established for the elections of 1949 and 1953, as a four-member constituency.  This constituency was eliminated in 1958 and divided into several single-member constituencies, one of which was also called Winnipeg Centre.  This single-member constituency lasted until 1981, when it too was eliminated through redistribution.

Winnipeg Centre (original constituency, 1888-1920)
Winnipeg Centre was created for the 1888 election, when the city of Winnipeg was granted a third seat.  It had previously been represented in the legislature by Winnipeg North and Winnipeg South.

Winnipeg Centre, a single-member constituency, was turned into a two-member dual-ballot district prior to the 1914 election.  Electors were allowed to cast two ballots, one for each of the two separate seats, which were called "Winnipeg Centre A" and "Winnipeg Centre B".

The constituency only returned four representatives in its history, all of whom were prominent figures.  

Daniel Hunter McMillan was a cabinet minister in Thomas Greenway's government, and later served as the Lieutenant Governor of Manitoba from 1911 to 1916.  

Thomas Taylor, his successor, had served as Mayor of Winnipeg in the 1890s. 

Thomas Herman Johnson was a prominent minister under Tobias Norris.

Fred Dixon was also elected in Winnipeg Centre in 1914. He was notable as the first Labour representative in the legislature.  In the elections of 1914 and 1915, he was co-endorsed by the Liberal Party and the Labour Representation Committee. In 1920, running in the new city-wide district he won as a DLP candidate.

Members of the Legislative Assembly for Winnipeg Centre

Members of the Legislative Assembly for Winnipeg Centre "A"

Members of the Legislative Assembly for Winnipeg Centre "B"

Winnipeg Centre (four-member constituency, 1949-1958)
The single Winnipeg constituency into three multiple-member districts for the 1949 election: Winnipeg North, Winnipeg Centre and Winnipeg South.  All three constituencies elected four members to the legislature, with electors choosing representatives by a single transferable ballot.

The electorate of Winnipeg Centre included supporters of the socialist Cooperative Commonwealth Federation, the Liberal-Progressive and the Progressive Conservative Party.  Independent candidate Stephen Juba also won election to the legislature in 1953.

Members of the Legislative Assembly for Winnipeg Centre (1949-1958)

Winnipeg Centre (single member constituency, 1958-1981)
The single-member electoral division of Winnipeg Centre was created with the 1958 election, after the four-member division of the same name was eliminated.

The constituency was represented by Progressive Conservative James Cowan from 1958 to 1969, and was considered safe for the PC Party.  Joseph "Bud" Boyce of the New Democratic Party won it in 1969, and held it until its abolition in 1981.  Boyce left the NDP to join the newly formed Progressive Party prior to the 1981 election.

Members of the Legislative Assembly for Winnipeg Centre (1958-1981)

Election results

1888 general election

1889 by-election

1892 general election

1896 general election

1899 general election

1900 by-election

1903 general election

1907 general election

1910 general election

1914 general election

Winnipeg Centre A

Winnipeg Centre B

1915 general election

Winnipeg Centre A

Winnipeg Centre B

1949 general election

1953 general election

1958 general election

1959 general election

1962 general election

1966 general election

1969 general election

1973 general election

1977 general election

References 

Former provincial electoral districts of Manitoba